Sergei Mikhailovich Shepelev; born October 13, 1955 in Nizhny Tagil, Soviet Union) is a retired ice hockey player who played in the Soviet Hockey League. He played left wing for HC Spartak Moscow. Internationally, he was a member of the USSR national ice hockey team that won the 1981 Canada Cup and the gold medal at the 1984 Winter Olympics in Sarajevo. He was named to the 1981 Canada Cup All-Star Team. He was inducted into the Russian and Soviet Hockey Hall of Fame in 1981.

Career statistics

Regular season and playoffs

International

External links
 Russian and Soviet Hockey Hall of Fame bio
 

1955 births
Living people
HC Spartak Moscow players
Soviet ice hockey centres
Olympic medalists in ice hockey
Olympic ice hockey players of the Soviet Union
Ice hockey players at the 1984 Winter Olympics
Olympic gold medalists for the Soviet Union
Medalists at the 1984 Winter Olympics
Honoured Masters of Sport of the USSR
Recipients of the Order of Friendship of Peoples
People from Nizhny Tagil
Sportspeople from Sverdlovsk Oblast